Ottaviano Preconio (died 1587) was a Roman Catholic prelate who served as Bishop of Cefalù (1578–1587).

Biography
On 11 August 1578, Ottaviano Preconio was appointed during the papacy of Pope Gregory XIII as Bishop of Cefalù.
He served as Bishop of Cefalù until his death on 11 April 1587.

References

External links and additional sources
 (for Chronology of Bishops) 
 (for Chronology of Bishops) 

16th-century Italian Roman Catholic bishops
Bishops appointed by Pope Gregory XIII
1587 deaths